Charmaine Náyade Carrasco (born June 17, 1984), is better known by her mononymous stage name Charmaine, is a Christian pop musician. Her parents are Chilean, but she holds dual Australian and United States citizenship.

Background and early life
Charmaine was born Charmaine Náyade Carrasco on June 17, 1984 in West Covina, California to Chilean parents Werner and Najee Carrasco (née, González), which is why she holds United States citizenship. However at an early age, her family moved to Sydney, Australia, so she gained Australian Citizenship through naturalization. In addition, Charmaine is an only child.

Music
Charmaine says that artists such as Kate Havnevik, Imogen Heap, Lily Allen, Coldplay just for "anthems in the choruses", Cigaros and Jónsi are who she credits as influences in her music making. Also, she states that DC Talk, Crystal Lewis and Jaci Velasquez are the musicians and bands she listened to while growing up, and she believes that her music sounds like Rachael Lampa. She says her album Love Reality is simply pure pop music with electronic dance elements.

Her second album received a five star rating from Jesus Freak Hideout's founder John DiBiase.

Personnel life
Charmaine is a member of the Seventh-day Adventist Church.

Discography
Studio Albums

EPs
 The Journey EP (independent) - 2008
 Love Somebody EP (independent) - June 17, 2014

Other appearances

References

External links
 Christian Music Zine interview
 CNN en Español interview

1984 births
Living people
Australian Christians
Australian women singers
American performers of Christian music
Australian performers of Christian music
American women pop singers
Singers from California
Musicians from Sydney
Naturalised citizens of Australia
People from West Covina, California
Australian songwriters
Songwriters from California
American dance musicians
Australian dance musicians
American synth-pop musicians
Synth-pop singers
American emigrants to Australia
American people of Chilean descent
Australian people of Chilean descent
Hispanic and Latino American musicians
21st-century American women singers
21st-century American singers
21st-century Australian singers
American women in electronic music
Hispanic and Latino American women singers